Molnupiravir, sold under the brand name Lagevrio, is an antiviral medication that inhibits the replication of certain RNA viruses. It is used to treat COVID-19 in those infected by SARS-CoV-2. It is taken by mouth.

Molnupiravir is a prodrug of the synthetic nucleoside derivative N4-hydroxycytidine and exerts its antiviral action by introducing copying errors during viral RNA replication.

Molnupiravir was originally developed to treat influenza at Emory University by the university's drug innovation company, Drug Innovation Ventures at Emory (DRIVE), but was reportedly abandoned for mutagenicity concerns. It was then acquired by Miami-based company Ridgeback Biotherapeutics, which later partnered with Merck & Co. to develop the drug further.

Based on positive results in placebo-controlled double-blind randomized clinical trials, molnupiravir was approved for medical use in the United Kingdom in November 2021. In December 2021, the U.S. Food and Drug Administration (FDA) granted an emergency use authorization (EUA) to molnupiravir for use in certain populations where other treatments are not feasible. The emergency use authorization was only narrowly approved (13-10) because of questions about efficacy and concerns that molnupiravir's mutagenic effects could create new variants that evade immunity and prolong the COVID-19 pandemic.

Medical uses 
Molnupiravir is indicated for the treatment of mild-to-moderate coronavirus disease (COVID-19) in adults with positive results of direct SARS-CoV-2 viral testing who are at high risk for progression to severe COVID-19 and for whom alternative FDA-authorized COVID-19 treatments are not accessible or clinically appropriate. It is the second oral medication against COVID 19 after nirmatrelvir/ritonavir, but with a lower efficacy: about  against hospitalization or death in unvaccinated adults with mild or moderate COVID-19 and at least one risk factor for disease progression.

Contraindications 
Use during pregnancy is not recommended. There are no human data on use during pregnancy to assess the risk of adverse maternal or fetal outcomes. Based on animal data, the drug may cause fetal harm.

In rats, bone and cartilage toxicity was observed after repeated dosing.

Adverse effects 
Adverse reactions observed in the phase III MOVe-OUT study included diarrhea (2%), nausea (1%) and dizziness (1%), all of which were mild or moderate.

Overdose 
The effects of overdose are unknown, treatment consists of general supportive measures such as monitoring of clinical status.

Drug interactions 
Based on limited available data, there are no drug interactions.

Mechanism of action 
Molnupiravir inhibits viral reproduction by promoting widespread mutations in the replication of viral RNA by RNA-directed RNA polymerase. It is metabolized into a ribonucleoside analog that resembles cytidine, β-D-N4-Hydroxycytidine 5′-triphosphate (also called EIDD-1931 5′-triphosphate or NHC-TP). During replication, the virus's enzyme incorporates NHC-TP into newly made RNA instead of using real cytidine.

Molnupiravir can swap between two forms (tautomers), one of which mimics cytidine (C) and the other uridine (U). NHC-TP is not recognized as an error by the virus's proofreading exonuclease enzymes, which can replace mutated nucleotides with corrected versions. When the viral RNA polymerase attempts to copy RNA containing molnupiravir, it sometimes interprets it as C and sometimes as U. This causes more mutations in all downstream copies than the virus can survive, an effect called viral error catastrophe or lethal mutagenesis.
Top, a G.molnupiravir base pair with three hydrogen bonds. Bottom, an A.molnupiravir base pair with two hydrogen bonds. Molnupiravir can mimic both C and U. The wiggly lines stand for the connection to the pentose sugar and point in the direction of the minor groove.

Chemistry
The first synthesis of molnupiravir was disclosed in a patent filed by Emory University in 2018.

In the first step, acetone is used as a protecting group to render two of the three hydroxy groups of uridine unreactive to treatment with the acid anhydride of isobutyric acid, which converts the third hydroxy group to its ester. Treatment with 1,2,4-triazole and phosphoryl chloride produces a reactive intermediate in which the triazole portion can be replaced with hydroxylamine. Finally, removal of the protecting group using formic acid converts the material to molnupiravir.

Alternative patented routes to molnupiravir have been reviewed.

History 
Molnupiravir was developed at Emory University by its drug innovation company, Drug Innovation Ventures at Emory (DRIVE). In 2014, DRIVE began a screening project funded by the Defense Threat Reduction Agency to find an antiviral drug targeting Venezuelan equine encephalitis virus (VEEV), which led to the discovery of EIDD-1931. When turned into the prodrug EIDD-2801 (molnupiravir), the compound also showed activity against other RNA viruses including influenza, Ebola, chikungunya, and various coronaviruses.

The international nonproprietary name of the drug was inspired by that of Thor's hammer, Mjölnir. The idea is that the drug will strike down the virus like a mighty blow from the god of thunder.

In 2019, the National Institute of Allergy and Infectious Diseases (NIAID) approved moving molnupiravir into Phase I clinical trials for influenza.

In March 2020, the research team pivoted to studying SARS-CoV-2, and successfully used molnupiravir to treat human cells infected with the novel coronavirus. A study found that it is orally active against SARS-CoV-2 in ferrets.

DRIVE then licensed molnupiravir for human clinical studies to Miami-based company Ridgeback Biotherapeutics, which later partnered with Merck & Co. to develop the drug further.

The primary data supporting the U.S. Food and Drug Administration (FDA) emergency use authorization for molnupiravir are from MOVe-OUT, a randomized, double-blind, placebo-controlled clinical trial studying molnupiravir for the treatment of non-hospitalized participants with mild to moderate COVID-19 at high risk for progression to severe COVID-19 and/or hospitalization. Participants were adults 18 and older with a pre-specified chronic medical condition or at increased risk of SARS-CoV-2 infection for other reasons who had not received a COVID-19 vaccine. The main outcome measured in the trial was the percentage of people who were hospitalized or died due to any cause during 29 days of follow-up. Of the 709 people who received molnupiravir, 6.8% were hospitalized or died within this period compared to 9.7% of the 699 people who received a placebo.

In November 2022, the British National Institute for Health and Care Excellence decided molnupiravir should not be routinely used for Covid, as research showed it made no significant difference to hospitalization or death rates and was not cost effective. The drug was added to its "not recommended" list in draft Covid treatment guidance for consultation.

Society and culture

Economics 
In September 2021, Merck signed a voluntary licensing agreement with the Medicines Patent Pool (MPP) that allows MPP to sublicense molnupiravir and supply the COVID-19 oral medication to 105 low- and middle-income countries. The cost of the U.S. government's initial purchase was about $712 per course of treatment; treatment with generics in developing countries can cost as little as $20.

Sales of Molnupiravir were $952 million in the fourth quarter of 2021, which in part made Merck's sales figures increase with respect to the same period of the previous year.

Legal status 
On 11 October 2021, Merck submitted an EUA application to the FDA, and on 30 November 2021, the FDA's Antimicrobial Drugs Advisory Committee (AMDAC) at the Center for Drug Evaluation and Research met to discuss the application. The committee narrowly voted, 13 for and 10 opposed, to recommend authorization for adults with mild to moderate illness who are at high risk of developing severe COVID-19. Concerns were expressed over the drug's low effectiveness in preventing death, which in the final trial was only 30%, as well as the increased mutation rate the drug causes, which could theoretically worsen the pandemic by driving the evolution of more dangerous variants. In December 2021, the U.S. Food and Drug Administration (FDA) issued an emergency use authorization (EUA) for molnupiravir for the treatment of mild-to-moderate coronavirus disease (COVID-19) in adults with positive results of direct SARS-CoV-2 viral testing who are at high risk for progression to severe COVID-19, including hospitalization or death, and for whom alternative COVID-19 treatment options authorized by the FDA are not accessible or clinically appropriate.

In October 2021, the Committee for Medicinal Products for Human Use of the European Medicines Agency (EMA) started a rolling review of molnupiravir.

In November 2021, molnupiravir was approved in the U.K. by the Medicines and Healthcare products Regulatory Agency (MHRA) for the treatment of established infections of COVID-19. The MHRA issued a conditional marketing authorization applicable in the U.K., and an emergency use authorization for Northern Ireland.

In November 2021, the Bangladesh Directorate General of Drug Administration (DGDA) authorized emergency use of molnupiravir.

In January 2022, molnupiravir was approved for medical use in Israel.

Names 
Molnupiravir is the international nonproprietary name (INN).

Generic versions are available under the brand names Molulife (Mankind) and Molena (Emcure).

Public health concerns 
At a November 2021 AMDAC meeting, multiple advisors raised the concern that molnupiravir could accelerate the emergence of variants of concern. Other scientists raised similar concerns both before and after the meeting.

Research

COVID-19 clinical trial
In October 2021, preliminary results from a clinical trial (MOVe-OUT) indicated that treatment with molnupiravir may reduce the risk of hospitalization and death from COVID-19. The final analysis reported a 30% reduction in hospitalizations and deaths.

Since December 2021, the PANORAMIC trial has been testing molnupiravir's effectiveness. Results showed that for higher risk, vaccinated adults molnupiravir does not reduce the chances of hospitalisation and death. However it results in faster recovery and reduced viral load.

In February 2023, Merck reported that the phase 3 MOVe-AHEAD trial to evaluate the safety and efficacy of Lagevrio compared to placebo in preventing the spread of SARS-CoV-2 within households did not meet its primary endpoints.With more than 1,500 participants who were free of COVID-19 and lived with someone who was recently diagnosed with the virus, patients treated with Lagevrio were 23.6% less likely than those on placebo to develop COVID after 14 days.

References

Further reading

External links 

 

Anti–RNA virus drugs
Antiviral drugs
COVID-19 drug development
Hydroxylamines
Isobutyrate esters
Merck & Co. brands
Pyrimidines